Michael Largo, born in Staten Island (New York) in the fifties, is an American writer.

Early life
Born into a family of firefighters and police officers (both his grandfather that his father worked in the police department in New York), Largo has a maternal line descended from the first families Dutch who founded New Amsterdam (later New York).

Largo went to college on Staten Island and graduated in environmental science. He studied further in college in Brooklyn, with the poet John Ashbery, where he majored in English literature, winning the Whiteside Poetry Award.

Career
Later he moved to the East Village to focus on teaching, publishing articles in magazines and literary journals, also opening an art gallery. Largo also opened St. Marks Bar & Grill, from where he got the inspiration for his latest book: "Genius and Heroin: The Illustrated Catalogue of Creativity, Obsession and Reckless Abandon Through the Ages". This bar, originally a tavern active since the thirties, has become a meeting point for many artists, bohemians, as shown in the video of Rolling Stones called "Waiting on a Friend".

In the mid-eighties, Largo left New York to work on tugboats and other vessels, making the long lonely hours at the various ports to read the entire Encyclopædia Britannica (then admit that he has arrived "only" to the letter U). Later, he worked as an archivist at the company Allied Artists, continued to publish short stories and poems on magazines

In the early nineties, influenced by deaths close to him, Largo started studying the various causes of death in the United States. To obtain the information, he traveled throughout the country: this experience has culminated in the publication of Final Exits: The Illustrated Encyclopedia of How We Die, which won the Bram Stoker Award for non-fiction. Later he published The Portable Obituary: How the Famous, Rich, and Powerful Really Died.

After spending some years in Europe visiting the places where many brilliant minds have lived and eventually destroyed themselves, (resulting in the book Genius & Heroin), Largo moved near Atlanta.

Largo's work has been published and translated into twelve languages.

Awards and nominations
Largo received the Bram Stoker Award for Superior Achievement in Nonfiction, 2006, for Final Exits: The Illustrated Encyclopedia of How We Die.

The Portable Obituary was nominated for a Bram Stoker Award.

Personal life
Largo has been married three times, and has five children.

Bibliography
 Nails in Soft Wood (Piccadilly Press, 1974)
 Southern Comfort (New Earth Books, 1977)
 Lies Within (Tropical Press, 1997)
 Best of Pif. Edited by Camille Renshaw (Fusion Press, 2000)
 Unusual Circumstances : Short Fiction. (Pocol Press, 2000)
 Welcome to Miami (Tropical Press, 2001)
 Final Exits: The Illustrated Encyclopedia of How We Die (HarperCollins, 2006)
 The Portable Obituary: How the Famous, Rich, and Powerful Really Died (HarperCollins, 2007)
 Genius and Heroin: The Illustrated Catalogue of Creativity, Obsession and Reckless Abandon Through the Ages' (HarperCollins, 2008 )
 God's Lunatics: Lost Souls, False Prophets, Martyred Saints, Murderous Cults, Demonic Nuns, and Other Victims of Man's Eternal  Search for the Divine  (HarperCollins, 2010)
 The Big, Bad Book of Beasts: The World's Most Curious Creatures; William Morrow, 
 The Big, Bad Book of Botany: The World's Most Fascinating Flora; William Morrow; 

Co/author

 SEAL Survival Guide: A Navy SEAL's Secrets to Surviving Any Disaster; Gallery Books; 
 Easy Street (the Hard Way): A Memoir; Da Capo Press;

References
Contemporary Authors, Thomson Gale, 1977
Horror Writers Association: Bram Stoker Awards; https://web.archive.org/web/20070310031502/http://www.horror.org/stokers.htm
"A Grave Curiosity" Atlanta Journal-Constitution,October 9, 2008
"The Alternative Encyclopedist: A Talk With Michael Largo." Literary Kicks, September, 2010

 Huffington Post: https://www.huffpost.com/author/michael-largo

PBS interview: https://www.wlrn.org/post/botany-tour-book-fair-stories-michael-largo
 
The Daily Beast: https://www.thedailybeast.com/michael-largo-interviewed-about-gods-lunatics

Esquire: https://www.esquire.com/entertainment/books/a5239/genius-and-heroin-blog/

Washington Post: https://www.washingtonpost.com/entertainment/books/the-big-bad-book-of-beasts-by-michael-largo/2013/05/28/9e97d6b4-c2f6-11e2-9fe2-6ee52d0eb7c1_story.html

External links 
Official Website of Michael Largo

 https://www.harpercollins.com/author/cr-103732/michael-largo/

21st-century American non-fiction writers
20th-century American non-fiction writers
Living people
People from the East Village, Manhattan
Year of birth missing (living people)
1950s births